Miroslav Angelov Gochev (born April 9, 1973 in Burgas) is a retired amateur Bulgarian freestyle wrestler, who competed in the men's light heavyweight category. Gochev has claimed a bronze medal in the 76-kg division at the 1997 World Wrestling Championships in Wrocław, Poland, picked up a silver at the 2001 European Championships in Budapest, Hungary, and later represented his nation Bulgaria at the 2004 Summer Olympics. Throughout his sporting career, Gochev trained full time as a member of the wrestling squad for Slavia Litex Sports Club in Sofia under his personal coach Miho Dukov.

Gochev qualified for the Bulgarian squad, as a 31-year-old veteran, in the men's 84 kg class at the 2004 Summer Olympics in Athens, by receiving an allocated berth from the International Federation of Associated Wrestling (FILA). Facing against two Olympic medalists from Sydney four years earlier, Gochev opened an astonishing 4–2 victory over Macedonia's Mogamed Ibragimov, but could not push South Korean wrestler Moon Eui-Jae off the mat, and suffered a defeat by a 5–9 score at the end of the round-robin. Finishing second in the prelim pool and twelfth overall, Gochev's performance was not enough to advance him to the quarterfinals.

References

External links
 

1973 births
Living people
Bulgarian male sport wrestlers
Olympic wrestlers of Bulgaria
Wrestlers at the 2004 Summer Olympics
Sportspeople from Burgas
World Wrestling Championships medalists
European Wrestling Championships medalists